Snap was an on-demand coach company in the United Kingdom, based in London.

Snap did not operate its own coaches. It chartered coaches from local operators to satisfy demand by users booking journeys online via its Getasnap mobile app. It ran coaches only when there was sufficient demand.

The company began operating in November 2016. It operated services between London, Bristol, Nottingham, Cambridge and Cardiff. Pick-up and set-down points are determined by the requests of passengers.

It stopped operating in March 2020 during the COVID-19 pandemic and announced in August 2021 that it would not be restarting.

References

External links 
 Official website

Demand responsive transport in the United Kingdom
Coach transport in the United Kingdom
Companies based in London
Ridesharing companies of the United Kingdom